Willamis de Souza Silva (born 4 February 1979), commonly known as Souza, is a Brazilian former professional footballer who played as a midfielder, and is now a television pundit for Bandeirantes.

Honours

Club
CSA
Campeonato Alagoano: 1999

São Paulo
Campeonato Paulista: 2005
Copa Libertadores: 2005
FIFA Club World Cup: 2005
Campeonato Brasileiro Série A: 2006, 2007

Paris Saint-Germain
Coupe de la Ligue: 2008

Grêmio
Campeonato Gaúcho: 2010

Portuguesa
Campeonato Paulista Série A2: 2013

Ceará
Campeonato Cearense: 2014

Brasiliense
Campeonato Brasiliense: 2017

Individual
 Campeonato Brasileiro Série A Team of the Year: 2006

References

External links
globoesporte.globo.com 

CBF 

1979 births
Living people
Brazilian footballers
Brazilian expatriate footballers
Expatriate footballers in Paraguay
Expatriate footballers in France
Association football midfielders
Campeonato Brasileiro Série A players
Campeonato Brasileiro Série B players
Ligue 1 players
Centro Sportivo Alagoano players
Botafogo de Futebol e Regatas players
Club Libertad footballers
Guarani FC players
Associação Atlética Portuguesa (Santos) players
São Paulo FC players
Paris Saint-Germain F.C. players
Grêmio Foot-Ball Porto Alegrense players
Fluminense FC players
Cruzeiro Esporte Clube players
Associação Portuguesa de Desportos players
Ceará Sporting Club players
Esporte Clube Passo Fundo players
Sociedade Esportiva e Recreativa Caxias do Sul players
Brasiliense Futebol Clube players
Copa Libertadores-winning players
People from Maceió
Sportspeople from Alagoas